Sundown in Santa Fe is a 1948 American Western film directed by R. G. Springsteen, written by Norman S. Hall, and starring Allan Lane, Eddy Waller, Roy Barcroft, Trevor Bardette, Jean Dean and Russell Simpson. It was released on November 5, 1948 by Republic Pictures.

Plot

Cast    
Allan Lane as Rocky Lane 
Black Jack as Black Jack 
Eddy Waller as Horace Harvey 'Nugget' Clark
Roy Barcroft as Tracy Gillette
Trevor Bardette as Walter Surrat aka John Stuart
Jean Dean as Lola Gillette
Russell Simpson as Sheriff Jim Wyatt
Rand Brooks as Tom Wyatt
Lane Bradford as Bronc Owens
B.G. Norman as Johnny Wyatt
Minerva Urecal as Ella Mae Watson
Joseph Crehan as Major Larkin

References

External links 
 

1948 films
American Western (genre) films
1948 Western (genre) films
Republic Pictures films
Films directed by R. G. Springsteen
American black-and-white films
1940s English-language films
1940s American films